Pablo Beltrán Ruiz (born 5 March 1915 in Los Mochis, Sinaloa, Mexico - died 29 July 2008) was a Mexican composer and bandleader, most famous for composing the song "¿Quién será?", a Spanish-language hit that, with English lyrics by Norman Gimbel, was made famous internationally by Dean Martin as "Sway" in 1954, and by Bobby Rydell in 1960. Other songs by Beltràn include "Picnic a Go-Go" (1966) and "La Sombra de tu Sonrisa" (1966), an instrumental version of "The Shadow of Your Smile".

Biography 
Pablo Beltrán Ruiz was born in 1915 to Ladislao Rosas and Felipa Rodríguez. He moved to Mexico City where he studied Law for one year and Chemistry for 3 years. He also studied music at the Escuela Libre de Música (Free School of Music) in Mexico, under the guidance of professor José Vázquez.

¿Quién Será?/Sway 
"¿Quién será la que me quiera a mí?" (meaning in English  "Who will be the one to love me?" was recorded in 1953 by "Pablo Beltrán Ruiz y Su Orchestra" and was a minor hit before Dean Martin's 1954 release. It eventually became one of the best known Latin classics worldwide.

Other works 
His music has been frequently used in soundtracks of a number of films such as: Escuela de vagabundos (1954) starring Pedro Infante and Miroslava, ¡Paso a la juventud..! (1957) starring Tin Tan, México nunca duerme (1958) directed by Alejandro Galindo and Su Excelencia (1966) starring Mario Moreno "Cantinflas".

References

External links

Pablo Beltrán Ruiz page on Discogs.com

1915 births
2008 deaths
Mexican musicians